Polu may refer to:

 
 Polu, Khuzestan, Iran
 Polu or pilaf, a rice dish
 Junior Polu, Samoan rugby player